Pleasant Bay is a bay of the Atlantic Ocean just north of the "elbow" of Cape Cod in Massachusetts. It is bounded on the east by a long peninsula and a barrier island, and harbors  of saltwater when the tide is in.

History 
The first people to discover the bay were the Native American tribe the Nausets. They referred to it as Monomoyik which translates to "Great Bay". It is also reported that in this area Squanto, the guide of the Mayflower Pilgrims, is buried. The area is full of artifacts and places which hold the names of these Native American tribes.

Geography 

Pleasant Bay is the largest contiguous bay along the Cape Cod National Seashore. It is located along the towns of Orleans, Chatham, Harwich, and a small part of Brewster. It also includes several beaches and islands:

 Nauset Beach
 Barrier Beach
 Monomoy Island
 North Beach Island
 Sipson Island
 Little Sipson Island
 Hog Island
 Sampson Island
 Tern Island
 Pochet Island
 Little Pochet Island
 Strong Island

Bays of Massachusetts
Landforms of Barnstable County, Massachusetts
Orleans, Massachusetts